Diary is a 1997 Maldivian drama film written, produced and directed by Mohamed Aboobakuru. The film stars Hassan Afeef, Waleedha Waleed, Mohamed Aboobakuru and Arifa Ibrahim in pivotal roles.

Premise
Arif (Hassan Afeef), an only child, begins a romantic relationship with Shehenaz (Waleedha Waleed), a well-educated woman. The couple plan their marriage when Arif suspects his best friend, Fayaz (Mohamed Aboobakuru) is deeply in love with Shehenaz. However, Fayaz explains that his secret girlfriend is Saudhiyya who is now engaged to another man. Arif is diagnosed with stage 4 pancreatic cancer which has now spread to his liver and he is given six months to live. Arif requests Fayaz to marry Shehenaz and to keep her happy.

Cast 
 Hassan Afeef as Arif
 Waleedha Waleed as Shehenaz
 Mohamed Aboobakuru as Fayaz
 Arifa Ibrahim as Shehenaz's mother
 Hamid Wajeeh as Saleem
 Aminath Mohamed Didi as Arif's mother
 Mohamed Azim as Shehenaz's brother
 Sheleen as Shehenaz's sister
 Dhilaavathu

Soundtrack

Accolades

References

Maldivian drama films
1997 drama films
Dhivehi-language films